Tom is a Canadian documentary film, directed by Mike Hoolboom and released in 2002. The film is a portrait of underground filmmaker Tom Chomont.

The film premiered at the 2002 Toronto International Film Festival.

The film was named to the Toronto International Film Festival's year-end Canada's Top Ten list for 2002.

References

External links
 

2002 films
Canadian documentary films
Canadian LGBT-related films
Documentary films about gay men
2002 LGBT-related films
Films directed by Mike Hoolboom
2000s English-language films
2000s Canadian films